Patrick Wayne Ribble (born April 26, 1954) is a Canadian former professional ice hockey player who played in the National Hockey League between 1975 and 1983.

A defenceman, Ribble was selected in 1974 by both the Atlanta Flames of the National Hockey League and the Indianapolis Racers of the World Hockey Association. He also played for the Chicago Black Hawks, Toronto Maple Leafs, Washington Capitals, and Calgary Flames. In addition, in 1978 Pat Ribble played at the World Championships with Canada, winning a bronze medal.

Career statistics

Regular season and playoffs

International

External links

Profile at hockeydraftcentral.com

1954 births
Living people
Atlanta Flames draft picks
Atlanta Flames players
Calgary Flames players
Canadian expatriate ice hockey players in the United States
Canadian ice hockey defencemen
Chicago Blackhawks players
Colorado Flames players
Ice hockey people from Ontario
Indianapolis Checkers players
Indianapolis Racers draft picks
Oklahoma City Stars players
Omaha Knights (CHL) players
Oshawa Generals players
Salt Lake Golden Eagles (IHL) players
People from Leamington, Ontario
Toronto Maple Leafs players
Tulsa Oilers (1964–1984) players
Washington Capitals players